Nagoor may refer to the following places in India:
 Nagore, a town in Tamil Nadu
 Nagoor, Medak, a village in Medak district, Telangana
 Nagoor, Aurad, a village in Aurad, Bidar, Karnataka
 Nagoor, Bhalki, a village in Bhalki, Bidar, Karnataka
 Nagoor, a rural locality in Byndoor, Karnataka, India

See also 
 Nagur, a city in Iran
 Nagaur, a city in Rajasthan, India
 Nagore (disambiguation)